Suga may refer to:

 Suga, Iran, a village in Qazvin Province, Iran
 Suga language, a language of Cameroon
 Suga (rapper) (born 1993), South Korean rapper, songwriter, and record producer
 Suga (EP), 2020 EP by Megan Thee Stallion
 Suga, 1996 album by female hip hop duo Terri & Monica

People with the surname
 Daiki Suga (born 1988), Japanese football forward
 Hiroaki Suga (born 1963), Japanese chemist
 Hiroe Suga (born 1963), Japanese writer
 Hirofumi Suga (comedian) (born 1976), Japanese comedian
 Hirofumi Suga (garden designer), Japanese garden designer and landscape architect
 Hiroshi Suga (born 1945), Japanese photographer
 Kantarō Suga (1934–1994), Japanese actor
 Kenta Suga (born 1994), Japanese actor
 Kishio Suga (born 1944), Japanese sculptor and installation artist
 Nobuo Suga (born 1933), Japanese biologist
 Shikao Suga (born 1966), Japanese musician and singer-songwriter
 Shōtarō Suga (1977–2015), Japanese screenwriter
 Takamasa Suga (born 1977), Japanese actor
 Tatsuji Suga (1885–1945), Japanese military commander
 Toshiro Suga (born 1950), Japanese aikido instructor
 Yoshihide Suga (born 1948), Japanese politician and former Prime Minister of Japan
 , Japanese sport wrestler

See also
 Suga Pop, a dance
 Sugababes, an English pop girl group
 Princess Suga

Japanese-language surnames